The 2020 Sydney SuperSprint (known for commercial reasons as the 2020 BP Ultimate Sydney SuperSprint) is a motor racing event for the Supercars Championship held on Saturday 27 June through to Sunday 28 June 2020. The event was held at Sydney Motorsport Park in Eastern Creek, New South Wales. It was the third event of the 2020 Supercars Championship and consisted of three races of 125 kilometres.

It marked the first round of the championship held since the COVID-19 pandemic caused the cancellation of races at the Melbourne 400 in March.

Results

Practice

Race 1

Qualifying

Race

Race 2

Qualifying

Race

Race 3

Qualifying

Race

References

External links
Official website

Sydney SuperSprint
Motorsport in Sydney